Cinema City Nablus was a movie theater in the Palestinian city of Nablus, located in the West Bank.

The cinema opened in 2009.  Built at a cost of $2 million, it was in a new ten-story commercial in the city center which also included a shopping mall.  According to National Public Radio, the theater featured a "shiny" lobby with a snack bar.

Former theater manager Farouk Masri told journalists that his family had decided that the political situation had calmed sufficiently to make building a modern movie house profitable in a city that had lacked one for many years.  "It's been missing from Nablus, the cinema houses, been missing since the first intifada, over 20 years."  He said that the new cinema was, "The talk of the street, I keep hearing ... Everybody is just excited, they're very positive about it, and they're very supportive".  Among the excited children in the audience were many who had never seen a movie shown in a theater, only on the small screens of televisions and video players.

Relaxed checkpoint rules meant that Arabs from many towns could come to Nablus for shopping, dining and movies.  The theater featured four showings a day of international films "including the latest Egyptian movies" in addition to private event hire.

Masri hailed the new cinema as "awe inspiring" but accused the international press of being "there-for-the-moment reporters" who seem "to have come down with a case of 'occupation isn't so bad' syndrome" as they focus on "the new thrills of the Nablus cinema" rather than on "the people's actual grievances".

The owner, Marwan Al-Masri, stated that the reason was the low audience turnout and the lack of regulation to safeguard the intellectual property rights for films.

References

External links
Cinema City website

Buildings and structures in Nablus
Cinemas in the State of Palestine
Theatres in the State of Palestine
2009 establishments in the Palestinian territories